Interval is a 1939 play by Sumner Locke Elliott. It was popular and was performed throughout Australia at a time when this was not common for local plays.

The play is set behind the scenes of a long-running stage show in London.

It was published in 1942.

References

External links
Interval at AusStage

Australian plays
1939 plays